This article will deal with a list of historical National Hockey League over-the-air television broadcasters.

Note: The teams listed in italics are teams that have since relocated or disbanded.

Local

See also
List of current National Hockey League broadcasters
List of Stanley Cup Finals broadcasters#Local television

1ABC owned television station.

2CBS owned television station.

3Fox owned television station.

4NBC owned television station.

National

American

Canadian

See also
Historical Major League Baseball over-the-air television broadcasters
Historical NBA over-the-air television broadcasters

References

Over-the-air television broadcasters
Over-the-air television broadcasters
Over-the-air television broadcasters
 
Local sports television programming in the United States